Grand Canary is a 1934 American drama film directed by Irving Cummings and starring Warner Baxter, Madge Evans and Marjorie Rambeau. It is an adaptation of A. J. Cronin's 1933 novel of the same title.

Synopsis
A British Doctor is forced to leave England after three of his patents die during experimental treatment. He boards a freighter from Liverpool and lands in the Canary Islands. He encounters the Lady Mary Fielding, wife of one of the wealthiest landowners in the area, and explains to her that the patients died before he could administer his new serum to them, and he has been falsely scapegoated by the medical profession. When a yellow fever outbreak threatens the health of many on the island, including Lady Fielding, he takes a key role in quelling the disease. In this time he bonds with  Suzan Tranter, running a medical mission, who he has known for some years. Lady Fielding returns to her husband and the Doctor finds happiness with Susan.

Cast

Warner Baxter as Dr. Harvey Leith
Madge Evans as Lady Mary Fielding
Marjorie Rambeau as Daisy Hemingway
Zita Johann as Suzan Tranter
Roger Imhof as Jimmy Corcoran
H.B. Warner as Dr. Ismay
Barry Norton as Robert Tranter
Juliette Compton as Elissa Baynham
Gilbert Emery as Captain Renton
John Rogers as Trout
Carrie Daumery as the Marquesa
 Desmond Roberts as Purser
Keith Hitchcock as Michael Fielding
George Regas as El Dazo
 Sam Appel as Miguel
 Rosa Rey as 	Manuella
 Harrington Reynolds as  Quartermaster 
 Rodolfo Hoyos as 	Singer

References

Bibliography
 Goble, Alan. The Complete Index to Literary Sources in Film. Walter de Gruyter, 1999.
 Solomon, Aubrey. The Fox Film Corporation, 1915-1935: A History and Filmography. McFarland, 2011.

External links

1934 films
Fox Film films
1934 drama films
American drama films
American black-and-white films
1930s English-language films
Films based on British novels
Films based on works by A. J. Cronin
Films directed by Irving Cummings
Films set in the Canary Islands
Films set in Liverpool
Medical-themed films
Films scored by Cyril J. Mockridge
Films scored by Hugo Friedhofer
Films scored by Arthur Lange
1930s American films